The Reserve Infantry Division of Yan'an() was a short-lived reserve infantry formation of the People's Liberation Army active between 1984 and 1985.

The division was formally activated in August 1984 in Yan'an, Shaanxi. The division was then composed of:
1st Regiment
2nd Regiment - Yanchuan
3rd Regiment - Zichang
Artillery Regiment

As of its activation, the division was composed of 13,392 personnel, including 30 active service cadres (officers) and 1595 reserve service cadres.

In 1985 the division was disbanded along with all its subordinates.

References

Reserve divisions of the People's Liberation Army
Military units and formations established in 1984